Barcam (An Barr Cam) is a mountain in County Offaly, Ireland.

Geography 

See also
List of mountains in Ireland

References

Mountains and hills of County Offaly